Fath may refer to:

People
 Given name
 Abol Fath Khan (1755/56 – 1787), third Shah of the Zand dynasty, ruler of the Persian Empire in 1779
 Abu'l-Fath, 14th-century Samaritan chronicler
 Abu'l-Fath an-Nasir ad-Dailami (died 1053), imam of the Zaidi state in Yemen
 Abu'l-Fath Musa (died 1034), Shaddadid ruler in Armenia
 Abu'l-Fath Yusuf, 12th-century Persian vizier to Arslan-Shah of Ghazna
 al-Fath ibn Khaqan (ca. 817/818 – 861), Abbasid writer and official, friend and chief adviser of Caliph al-Mutawakkil
 al-Fath ibn Khaqan (al-Andalus) (died 1134), Andalusian writer
 Fatḥ al-Din Ibn Sayyid al-Nās (1272–1334), Egyptian theologian
 Fath al-Qal'i, ruler of Aleppo in 1016
 Fath-Ali Khan Afshar, Afsharid chieftain in northern Iran
 Fath-Ali Khan Daghestani, Lezgian nobleman who served as vizier to the Safavid king (shah) Sultan Husayn
 Fath-Ali Khan Qajar (1686–1726), Persian military commander
 Fath-Ali Shah Qajar (1772–1834), second Qajar Emperor (Shah) of Iran
 Fath Muhammad (1704–1725), General of Mysore, India
 Fath Shah, ruler of Kashmir
 Mirza Fath-ul-Mulk Bahadur (1816/18 - 1856), the last Crown Prince of the Mughal Empire

 Surname
 Abu'l-Musafir al-Fath (died 929), the last Sajid amir of Azerbaijan
 Farah Fath (born 1984), American actress
 Georges Fath (1818–1900), French playwright, illustrator and writer
 Jacques Fath (1912–1954), French fashion designer
 Josef Fath (1911–1985), German international footballer
 Helmut Fath (1929–1993), German sidecar racer and engineer
 Ibrahim Khan Fath-i-Jang (reigned 1617–1624), Subahdar of Bengal
 Mahmud Abu al-Fath (1885–1958), Egyptian journalist
 Saoud Fath (born 1980), Qatari association footballer
 Sébastien Fath (born 1968), French professional historian
 Sinān ibn al-Fatḥ (ca. early 10th century), mathematician from Harran, Upper Mesopotamia
 Steffen Fäth (born 1990), German handball player
 Taj al-Din Shah-i Shahan Abu'l Fath ( – 1403), Mihrabanid malik of Sistan (in present-day eastern Iran, southern Afghanistan and western Pakistan)

Places
 Bu ol Fath, a village in Liravi-ye Jonubi Rural District, Imam Hassan District, Deylam County, Bushehr Province, Iran
 Dehnow-e Fath ol Mobin, a village in Ganjabad Rural District, Esmaili District, Anbarabad County, Kerman Province, Iran
 Fath, Iran, a village in Kohgiluyeh and Boyer-Ahmad Province
 Fath al Bu Sa`id, a village in Muscat, in northeastern Oman
 Fath Ali Kalat, a village in Pir Sohrab Rural District, in the Central District of Chabahar County, Sistan and Baluchestan Province, Iran
 Fath Bagh, a village in Anjirabad Rural District, in the Central District of Gorgan County, Golestan Province, Iran
 Fath Expressway, Tehran, Iran
 Fath ol Jalil, a village in Sarkhun Rural District, Qaleh Qazi District, Bandar Abbas County, Hormozgan Province, Iran
 Fath Olmobin District, Shush County, Khuzestan Province, Iran
 Fath Air Base, Iran
 Fath-e Maqsud, a village in Gerdeh Rural District, in the Central District of Namin County, Ardabil Province, Iran
 Hajji Fath Ali, a village in Yeylaq Rural District, in the Central District of Buin va Miandasht County, Isfahan Province, Iran
 Hasanabad-e Abu ol Fath, a village in Liravi-ye Miyani Rural District, Imam Hassan District, Deylam County, Bushehr Province, Iran
 Shah Abu ol Fath, a village in Sahrarud Rural District, in the Central District of Fasa County, Fars Province, Iran
 Shahrak-e Fath ol Mobin, a village in Balesh Rural District, in the Central District of Darab County, Fars Province, Iran
 Sheykh Nowruz Shahrak-e Fath, a village in Dasht-e Abbas Rural District, Musian District, Dehloran County, Ilam Province, Iran

Organisations
 Fath Riadi de Nador, a Moroccan association football club
 Fath Tehran F.C., an Iranian association football club
 Fath Union Sport, a Moroccan association football club based in Rabat

Other uses
 Al-Fath, a surah of the Qur'an
 Al-Fat'h Iraqi Short-range ballistic missile
 Fath (cannon), Iranian naval artillery
 Fath (newspaper), a defunct Iranian newspaper
 Al Fath (1926–1948), political magazine in Egypt 
 Fath al-Bari, a Sunni commentary in Sahih al-Bukhari, written by Ibn Hajr Asqalani
 Fath al-Mulhim, a commentary on Sahih Muslim, written by Shabbir Ahmad Usmani
 Fath Ali shah inscription (Cheshmeh-Ali), Rey, Iran
 Operation Fath ol-Mobin, a major Iranian military operation during the Iran-Iraq War
 Operation Fath 1, a joint Iranian and Iraqi Kurdish military operation during the Iran-Iraq War
 Order of Fath, a military award of the Iranian armed forces

See also
 Fateh (disambiguation)
 Fathul Bari Mat Jahya (born 1980), Malaysian Islamic scholar
 Ravayat-e Fath, an Iranian documentary TV series about the Iran-Iraq War
 Takmilat Fath al-Mulhim, a commentary by Muhammad Taqi Usmani completing the commentary of Shabbir Ahmad Usmani on Sahih Muslim